Events from the year 1982 in the United Kingdom. The year was dominated by the Falklands War.

Incumbents
 Monarch – Elizabeth II
 Prime Minister – Margaret Thatcher (Conservative)
 Parliament – 48th

Events

January
 1 January – ITV launches three regional TV stations – Central, TVS (Television South) and TSW (Television South West), replacing ATV Midlands, Southern Television and Westward Television respectively.
 2 January 
The Welsh Army of Workers claims responsibility for a bomb explosion at the Birmingham headquarters of Severn Trent Water.
British Rail retires its last Class 55 Deltic diesel-electric locomotives from service.
 10–15 January – The lowest ever UK temperature of −27.2 °C is recorded at Braemar, in Aberdeenshire. This equals the record set in the same place in 1895, and the record will be equalled again at Altnaharra in 1995.
 11 January – Mark Thatcher, son of the Prime Minister Margaret Thatcher, disappears in the Sahara desert during the Paris-Dakar rally.
 14 January – Mark Thatcher is found safe and well in the Sahara, six days after going missing.
 18 January – "A Complaint of Rape", the third episode of BBC One fly on the wall documentary Police, showing police treating a female complainant dismissively, is broadcast, leading to changes in police treatment of rape allegations.
 21 January – Miners vote against strike action and accept the National Coal Board offer of a 9.3% pay rise.
 26 January – Unemployment in the United Kingdom is recorded at over 3,000,000 people for the first time since the 1930s. However, the 11.5% of the workforce currently unemployed is approximately half of the record percentage which was reached half a century ago.

February
 February – Korean cars are imported to Britain for the first time with the launch of the Hyundai Pony, a range of three and five-door hatchbacks similar in size to the Ford Escort.
 1 February – Sales of tabloid newspapers are reported to have been boosted substantially since last summer by the introduction of bingo. The Sun has reportedly enjoyed the biggest rise in sales, now selling more than 4,000,000 copies a day on a regular basis.
 5 February – Laker Airways collapses, leaving 6,000 passengers stranded, with debts of £270,000,000.
 6 February – The Queen commemorates her Pearl Jubilee.
 12 February – Opening of the first Next clothing store, a rebranding of the merged Joseph Hepworth and Kendall chains masterminded by George Davies. It specialises in women's clothing.
 19 February – The DeLorean car factory in Belfast is put into receivership.
 22 February – The Apostolic Delegation is promoted to the Apostolic Nunciature to Great Britain by Pope John Paul II; the first pro-nuncio is Bruno Heim.
 23 February – The Glasgow-registered coal ship St. Bedan is bombed and sunk by an IRA unit driving a hijacked pilot boat on Lough Foyle in Northern Ireland.
 25 February – The European Court of Justice rules that schools in Britain cannot allow corporal punishment against the wishes of parents.
 27 February – The D'Oyly Carte Opera Company gives its last Gilbert and Sullivan performance at the end of a final London season, having been in near-continuous existence since 1875.

March
 3 March – The Queen opens the Barbican Centre, a performing arts venue in the City of London.
 12 March – Closure of Queen Street Mill, Burnley, the last steam-driven weaving shed to work commercially.
 18 March
 A legal case brought by Mary Whitehouse against the National Theatre concerning alleged obscenity in the play The Romans in Britain ends after the Attorney General intervenes.
 An Argentine scrap metal dealer raises the Argentine flag in South Georgia, Falkland Islands – a British overseas colony.
 19 March – Argentines land on South Georgia Island, precipitating the Falklands War.
 25 March – Roy Jenkins wins the Hillhead by-election in Glasgow for the Social Democratic Party, whose dream of an electoral breakthrough looks strong as they still head most of the opinion polls.
 29 March – Royal assent in London to the Canada Act 1982 sets the stage for the repatriation of the Canadian Constitution.

April
 1 April – A twelve-year-old unnamed Birmingham boy becomes one of the youngest people in England and Wales to be convicted of murder after he admits murdering an eight-year-old boy, and is sentenced to be detained indefinitely.
 2 April – Falklands War begins as Argentina invades the Falkland Islands.
 4 April – Falklands War: The British Falkland Islands government surrenders, placing the islands in Argentine control.
 5 April – Falklands War: Royal Navy task force sets sail to the Falklands from Portsmouth.
 7 April – Britain declares a 200-mile "exclusion zone" around the Falklands.
 17 April – By proclamation of the Queen of Canada on Parliament Hill, Canada repatriates its constitution, granting full political independence from the United Kingdom; included is the country's first entrenched bill of rights.
 21 April – Walsall F.C.'s hopes of becoming the first Football League club to ground-share are dashed when officials condemn their plans to sell their Fellows Park stadium and become tenants at the Molineux (home of Wolverhampton Wanderers).
 24 April
 The Eurovision Song Contest is held in Harrogate, Yorkshire and is won by Germany. 
 The first British serviceman dies in the Falklands conflict, when his Sea King helicopter crashes.
 25 April – Falklands War: Royal Marines recapture South Georgia.
 29 April – Daniel and Christopher Smith, Britain's first  twins conceived through in vitro fertilisatio, are born to Josephine and Stewart Smith at the Royal Free Hospital in London.
 30 April – The Conservatives return to the top of the opinion polls for the first time since late-1979, with the latest MORI poll showing that they have 43% of the vote, ahead of the SDP–Liberal Alliance.

May
 1 May – Falklands War: Operation Black Buck – A Royal Air Force Vulcan bomber takes off from Ascension Island and bombs Port Stanley Airport.
 2 May – Falklands War: nuclear submarine HMS Conqueror sinks the Argentine cruiser General Belgrano.
 4 May – Falklands War: Type 42 destroyer HMS Sheffield is badly damaged by an Exocet missile. It sinks on 10 May.
 21 May
 Falklands War: Royal Marines and paratroopers from the British Task Force land at San Carlos Bay on the Falkland Islands and raise the Union Jack.
 The Haçienda nightclub opens in Manchester.
 22 May – FA Cup holders Tottenham Hotspur draw 1–1 with Queen's Park Rangers in the Wembley final, forcing a replay. Tottenham are without their Argentine players Ossie Ardiles and Ricardo Villa, who have been temporarily removed from the team following barracking from rival fans over their home country's involvement in the war with Britain.
 21 May – Falklands War: frigate  is sunk by Argentine aircraft in Falkland Sound, killing 22 sailors.
 23 May – Falklands War: frigate HMS Antelope is hit by Argentine aircraft and explodes.
 25 May – Falklands War: destroyer  and requisitioned container ship  are sunk; Coventry by two Argentine A-4C Skyhawks and Atlantic Conveyor by two Exocets.
 26 May – Official opening of Kielder Water, a reservoir in Northumberland. It is the largest artificial lake in the UK by capacity (200 billion litres) and is surrounded by Kielder Forest; the largest planted woodland in Europe.
 27 May
 1982 Beaconsfield by-election is held as a result of the death of sitting Conservative MP Sir Ronald Bell. Tim Smith retains the seat for the Conservatives with a comfortable majority of 13,053 votes against the SDP–Liberal Alliance candidate Paul Tyler. Future Labour Prime Minister, Tony Blair finishes in third place with 3,886 votes, the only election of his political career that he will lose.
 Tottenham Hotspur win the FA Cup beating Queens Park Rangers 1–0 in a replay. A sixth-minute penalty from Glenn Hoddle is the only goal of the game which equals Aston Villa's record of seven FA Cup triumphs.
 28 May
 Pope John Paul II's visit to the United Kingdom, the first by a reigning pope, begins at Gatwick Airport; he later meets the Queen in London.
 Falklands War: Battle of Goose Green commences, the first land battle of the war. Lieutenant-Colonel H. Jones is killed in an action for which he is awarded a posthumous Victoria Cross. British troops reach Darwin, Falkland Islands.
 29 May
 Pope John Paul II's visit to the UK. Pope John Paul II visits Canterbury, the first time a pontiff has done so.
 Falklands War: Battle of Goose Green concludes when British paratroopers defeat a larger force of Argentine troops.
 31 May – Falklands War: Battle of Stanley.
 May – Alternative rock band The Smiths formed in Manchester by Johnny Marr and Morrissey.

June
 June – All restrictions on hire purchase lifted.
 3 June
 Israeli ambassador to the UK Shlomo Argov is shot in London, an event which provokes the 1982 Lebanon War; he dies in 2003 in Israel without regaining full consciousness.
 1982 Mitcham and Morden by-election held as a result of the sitting Labour MP (Bruce Douglas-Mann) transferring his allegiance to the new SDP. Angela Rumbold gains the seat for the Conservatives, the first gain achieved by a ruling party at a by-election since 1961 and the last until 2017.
 8 June
 U.S. President Ronald Reagan becomes the first American chief executive to address a joint session of Parliament.
 Falklands War: 48 British servicemen are killed when two supply ships are bombed by Argentine air strikes off Bluff Cove.
 9 June – Twenty pence coin first issued into circulation.
 14 June – Falklands War ends as British forces reach the outskirts of Stanley after "yomping" across East Falkland from San Carlos Bay. They arrive to find the Argentine forces flying white flags of surrender. The formal Argentine surrender in the Falklands War is signed this evening.
 16 June – Welsh miners go on strike to support health workers demanding a 12% pay rise.
 19 June – The body of "God's Banker", Roberto Calvi, chairman of Banco Ambrosiano, is found hanging beneath Blackfriars Bridge in London.
 21 June – The first child of The Prince and Princess of Wales is born at St Mary's Hospital, London (Paddington), the first birth in direct line of succession to the British throne to take place in a hospital.
 22 June – A British Airways Boeing 747 suffers a temporary four-engine flameout and damage to the exterior of the plane, after flying through the otherwise undetected ash plume from Indonesia's Galunggung.
 23 June – Support for the Conservative government continues to rise, mainly due to the success of the Falklands campaign, with a MORI opinion poll showing that they have a 51% approval rating.
 25 June – Northern Ireland defeat hosts Spain 1–0 in the World Cup, later being knocked out in the quarter finals.

July
 2 July – Roy Jenkins is elected as Leader of the SDP (Social Democratic Party).
 3 July – ASLEF train drivers in the United Kingdom go on strike over hours of work, returning to work on July 18.
 5 July – England draw 0–0 with hosts Spain and are eliminated from the World Cup in the second group stage. Ron Greenwood retires as England manager after five years and is succeeded by Ipswich Town manager Bobby Robson.
 9 July – Michael Fagan breaks into Buckingham Palace and is apprehended after entering the royal bedroom.
 15 July – Geoffrey Prime, a British GCHQ civil servant, is remanded in custody on charges under the Official Secrets Act 1911.
 19 July – Home Secretary William Whitelaw announces that Michael Trestrail (the Queen's bodyguard) has resigned from the Metropolitan Police Service over a relationship with a male prostitute.
 20 July – Hyde Park and Regents Park bombings: the Provisional IRA detonates two bombs in Central London, killing eight soldiers, wounding 47 people, and leading to the deaths of seven horses.
 21 July – HMS Hermes, the Royal Navy flagship during the Falklands War, returns home to Portsmouth to a hero's welcome.
 22 July
 Production of the Ford Cortina ends after twenty years and five generations, the final two of which were virtually identical. The Cortina's successor, the Sierra, will be built at Dagenham and in Belgium and will go on sale in the Autumn, though in slightly lower volumes than the smaller Escort which is now Ford's best-selling car. 
 Exclusion zone around the Falklands is lifted.
 Margaret Thatcher rejects calls in parliament for a return of the death penalty for terrorist murder.
 23 July – A coroner's jury returns a verdict of suicide on Roberto Calvi.

August
 1 August – The government creates Britoil as the privatised successor to the British National Oil Corporation.
 4 August – The first child of The Prince and Princess of Wales is christened William Arthur Philip Louis.
 28 August – Caryl Churchill's play Top Girls premieres at the Royal Court Theatre, London.
 29 August – 65-year-old American Ashby Harper becomes the oldest person to swim the English Channel.
 30 August – St David's Hall opens in Cardiff as the National Concert Hall and Conference Centre of Wales.

September
 7 September – Prime Minister Margaret Thatcher expresses her concern at the growing number of children living in single-parent families, but says that she is not opposed to divorce.
 22 September – An estimated 14% of the workforce is now reported to be unemployed.
 23 September – Nigel Lawson announces that no industry should remain in state ownership unless there is an "overwhelming" case.
 27 September – General Motors launches the Spanish-built Opel Corsa which will be sold in Britain from April next year as the Vauxhall Nova. The new front-wheel drive range of small hatchbacks and saloons will effectively replace the Chevette. However, the transport workers union has thrown the future of the new car which is expected to sell around 50,000 units a year, into jeopardy by blocking imports to Britain.
 30 September 
 Lord Denning delivers his last judgement as Master of the Rolls.
 After well over 100 years, the UK Inland Telegram service closes. Telegram figures peaked after the First World War with over 100m sent annually; by the time the service closes the annual figure is down to less than 3 million.

October
 8 October – With the economy now climbing out of recession after more than two years, Margaret Thatcher vows to stick to her neoliberal economic policies, and blames previous governments for the decline that she inherited when entering power more than three years ago.
 11 October – The Mary Rose, flagship of Henry VIII of England that sank in 1545, is raised from the Solent.
 12 October – The London Victory Parade of 1982 is held to mark the end of the Falklands war.
 15 October – The Ford Sierra is launched as a replacement for the long-running Cortina and its ultra-modern aerodynamic styling causes controversy among potential buyers who for years had been drawn to the conventional Cortina but it soon goes on to be a sales success.
 21 October – Sinn Féin win their first seats on the Northern Ireland Assembly, with Gerry Adams winning the Belfast West seat.
 27 October 
 The Homosexual Offences (Northern Ireland) Order 1982 comes into effect, decriminalising homosexuality in Northern Ireland for those aged 18 or older.
 Three RUC officers are killed by an IRA bomb near Lurgan in Northern Ireland.

November
 November – The Government announces that more than 400,000 council houses have been sold off under the right-to-buy scheme within the last three years.
 1 November
 The Welsh language television station, S4C, launches in Wales.
 Opinion polls show the Conservatives still firmly in the lead, suggesting that a general election will be held by next summer.
 2 November – The fourth terrestrial television channel, Channel 4, begins broadcasting, the first programme broadcast being the game show Countdown, hosted by Richard Whiteley. Another flagship programme is the Liverpool-based soap opera Brookside.
 7 November – The Thames Barrier is first publicly demonstrated.
 12 November – Express Lift Tower in Northampton officially opened.
 15 November – Unemployment remains in excess of 3,000,000 people – 13.8% of the workforce.
 28 November – Opinion polls show the Conservative government with an approval rating of up to 44% and well on course for a second successive electoral victory, 13 points ahead of Labour. Support for the Alliance has halved in the space of a year.

December
 3 December 
 UK release of the film Gandhi. This will win eight Academy Awards, including Best Picture, Best Director (Richard Attenborough) and Best Actor (Ben Kingsley) four months later. 
 UK release of the film animation The Plague Dogs based on the novel of the same name by Richard Adams; the film is controversial as it contains some violence.
 6 December – Droppin Well bombing: The Irish National Liberation Army kills seventeen people in a bomb attack at the Droppin Well Inn, Ballykelly, County Londonderry.
 10 December
 British chemist Aaron Klug wins the Nobel Prize in Chemistry "for his development of crystallographic electron microscopy and his structural elucidation of biologically important nucleic acid-protein complexes".
 John Robert Vane wins the Nobel Prize in Physiology or Medicine jointly with Sune Bergström and Bengt I. Samuelsson "for their discoveries concerning prostaglandins and related biologically active substances".
 12 December – Greenham Common Women's Peace Camp: 30,000 women hold hands and form a human chain around the 9-mile (14.5 km) perimeter fence.
 15 December – The British colony of Gibraltar gains a pedestrian link to Spain, as the gates which separated the two states are re-opened by the Spanish government after thirteen years.
 23 December – More than 1,200 jobs are lost in the West Midlands when the Round Oak Steelworks at Brierley Hill closes after 125 years.

Undated
 Inflation has fallen to a 10-year low of 8.6%, although some 1,500,000 jobs have reportedly been lost largely due to Government policy in attaining this end.
 Vauxhall drops the Opel symbol from its cars.

Publications
 Douglas Adams' comic novel Life, the Universe and Everything.
 William Boyd's novel An Ice-Cream War.
 Bruce Chatwin's novel On the Black Hill.
 Shirley Conran's novel Lace.
 Richard Dawkins' book The Extended Phenotype.
 Sue Townsend's comic novel The Secret Diary of Adrian Mole, Aged 13¾ (7 October, the character having been introduced earlier in the year in a BBC Radio 4 play).

Births

 1 January 
 Luke Rodgers, footballer
Gemma Hunt, television host
 4 January – Richard Logan, footballer
 6 January – Eddie Redmayne, actor
 9 January – Catherine, Princess of Wales
 13 January – Ruth Wilson, actress
 16 January – Preston, singer
 21 January – Nick Duncombe, rugby union player (died 2003)
 11 February – Natalie Dormer, actress
 25 February – Chris Baird, footballer
 26 February – Lisa Mason, gymnast
 9 March – Paul 'Des' Ballard, children's television presenter
 5 April – Hayley Atwell, actress
 7 April – Kelli Young, singer
 24 April – Laura Hamilton, children's television presenter
 26 April – Jon Lee, singer and actor
 28 April – Nikki Grahame, reality TV star (died 2021)
 3 May – Rebecca Hall, actress and filmmaker
 4 May – John Robins, comedian and radio presenter
 9 May - Mark Bedworth, rugby union footballer
 10 May – Adebayo Akinfenwa, footballer
 15 May – Douglas Simpson, Scottish field hockey forward
 19 May – Kevin Amankwaah, footballer
 7 June – Amy Nuttall, actress and singer
 12 June – James Tomlinson, English cricketer
 17 June
Arthur Darvill, British actor
Jodie Whittaker, British actor
 20 June – Example, rapper and singer-songwriter
 21 June – William, Prince of Wales
 9 July – Toby Kebbell, actor
 13 July – Simon Clist, footballer
 18 July – Andrew Alexander, actor
 28 July – Michael Rose, footballer
 30 July – James Anderson, cricketer
 10 August – Shaun Murphy, snooker player
 14 August – Benjamin Cohen journalist, founder of PinkNews.co.uk   
 3 September – Fearne Cotton, television presenter
 7 September – David Dawson, actor 
 12 September – Layla Moran, Liberal Democrat politician
 22 September – Billie Piper, singer and actress
 30 September – Michelle Marsh, model
 4 October – YolanDa Brown, jazz saxophonist
 7 October - Jermain Defoe, footballer
 8 October – Glenn Kirkham, field hockey player
 10 October – Dan Stevens, actor
 21 October – David Mansouri, Scottish field hockey defender
 26 October – Nicola Adams, boxer
 28 October – Matt Smith, actor
 9 November – Kieran Darlow, footballer
 13 November – Adam Shantry, cricketer
 14 November – Stephen Hughes, Scottish footballer
 27 November – Tommy Robinson, political activist
 5 December – Craig Farrell, English footballer (died 2022)
 7 December – Jack Huston, actor
 12 December – Louise Carroll, Scottish field hockey defender

Deaths

 30 January – Stanley Holloway, actor, comedian, singer and poet (born 1890)
 4 February – Alex Harvey, Scottish-born blues/rock musician (born 1935)
 5 February – Ernest Bader, businessman and philanthropist (born 1890)
 19 February – Margery Perham, Africanist (born 1895)
 21 March – Harry H. Corbett, actor (born 1925)
 31 March – Dave Clement, footballer (born 1948)
 15 April – Arthur Lowe, actor (born 1915)
 25 April – Celia Johnson, actress (born 1908)
 1 May – William Primrose, violist (born 1903)
 28 May – Lieutenant-Colonel H. Jones, Falklands War casualty and posthumous recipient of Victoria Cross (born 1940)
 12 June – Ian McKay, Falklands War casualty and posthumous recipient of Victoria Cross (born 1953)
 22 June – Alan Webb, actor (born 1906)
 16 June – James Honeyman-Scott, lead guitarist of the Pretenders (born 1956)
 4 July – Terry Higgins, early British casualty of AIDS
 12 July – Kenneth More, actor (born 1914)
 5 August – Sir John Charnley, orthopaedic surgeon (born 1911)
 8 August – Dorothy Edwards, children's author (born 1914)
 29 August – Ingrid Bergman, film actress (born 1915 in Sweden)
 5 September – Douglas Bader, World War II fighter pilot (born 1910)
 10 September – Jane Ingham,  botanist and scientific translator (born 1897)
 29 September – A. L. Lloyd, folk song collector (born 1908)
 20 October – Jimmy McGrory, Scottish footballer (born 1904)
 6 November – Sir Thomas Elmhirst, air marshal and Lieutenant Governor of Guernsey (born 1895)
 8 November – Jimmy Dickinson, footballer (born 1925)
 13 November – Chesney Allen, entertainer and singer (born 1894)
 16 November – Arthur Askey, comedian (born 1900)
 2 December – Marty Feldman, comedian and actor (born 1934)
 16 December – Colin Chapman, automotive engineer (born 1928)

See also
 List of British films of 1982

References

 
Years of the 20th century in the United Kingdom